Aleksandar Gugleta (born 17 July 1991) is a Serbian handball player who plays for Riihimäen Cocks.

Gugleta won a silver medal with the Serbian national team at the 2015 Summer Universiade.

References

External links
 
 

1991 births
Living people
Sportspeople from Knin
Serbs of Croatia
Serbian male handball players
Universiade medalists in handball
Universiade silver medalists for Serbia
Medalists at the 2015 Summer Universiade